Ambos Camarines (meaning "both"; commonly known as Camarines), officially the Province of Ambos Camarines, was a historical province in the Philippines found on the northern end of the Bicol Peninsula. It now exists as two separate provinces: Camarines Norte and Camarines Sur.

The province was founded in 1579 and was split into two, Camarines Norte and Sur in 1829. They were reunited under Ambos Camarines in 1854, but split again after three years. In 1893, they were reunited until March 10, 1917, when Act No. 2711 formed most of the present-day provinces, including Camarines Norte and Camarines Sur.

History

Creation
In 1569, Luis Enríquez de Guzmán, with Augustinian friar Alonzo Jiménez, reached the present town of Camalig, then a thriving village or ranchería. They found the natives living in thatched sheds called kamaligs (rice granaries). Andrez de Ibarra, while in search of provisions, followed the route taken by de Guzmán and reached Kalilingo and Búa (the present towns of Bato and Nabua) in 1570.

In 1573, Miguel López de Legazpi dispatched his grandson Juan de Salcedo to explore the region as far as Paracale in search of gold and other precious stones. A year later, Salcedo cruised the Bicol River and reached Bato Lake. Hence, the first recorded account of the discovery of the place.

In 1574, at the height of the Spanish colonization of the islands, Governor-General Guido de Lavezaris mentioned in his letter to the King of Spain, the land of Los Camarines – apparently referring to the area of what is now Camalig, Albay, where rice storehouses and granaries or camarin abound. Thus, the name "Camarines" was coined and somehow stuck. Spanish colonizers later denominated the area into two distinct regions.

Later, a Spanish garrison under Captain Pedro de Chávez was set up in present-day Naga, a prosperous native ranchería. In 1575, de Guzmán founded the City of Nueva Cáceres (present-day city of Naga) named after the birthplace of Governor-General Francisco de Sande in Cáceres, Spain.

On May 27, 1579, Governor-General de Sande issued a decree which led to the establishment of a settlement in Camarines where Spanish colonists were urged to reside.

In 1636, Ibalon was split into two: Partido de Ibalon (comprising what is now Albay, Catanduanes, Sorsogon, Masbate, and the islands of Ticao and Burias) and Partido de Camarines (all towns north of present-day Camalig, Albay).

Ambos Camarines

Partido de Camarines was further divided into Camarines Sur and Norte in 1829. From 1864 until 1893, Camarines Norte and Sur (collectively called Ambos Camarines) underwent a series of confusing geo-political division, fusion, re-division, and re-fusion, until in 1919 when the first Philippine Legislature finally separated Norte and Sur into two provinces. Camarines Norte's capital is Daet while Camarines Sur's capital town  was Naga, the city once called "Nueva Cáceres" – namesake of a province in Spain and among the original five royal cities of the colony.

The Philippine Revolution started in Ambos Camarines on September 17, 1898, when Elías Ángeles and Félix Plazo, Filipino corporals in the Spanish Army, sided with revolutionists and fought the local Spanish forces. With the arrival of General Vicente Lucbán, the revolutionary government in Bicol was established.

American forces occupied the Bicol Peninsula in January 1900. In March of the same year, General John M. Bell was made military governor of Southern Luzon. Civil government was finally established in Ambos Camarines in April 1901.

In March 1919, the Philippine Legislature issued an Act authorizing the Governor General to partition the province into Camarines Norte and Camarines Sur.

On 15 April 1920, Camarines Sur and Camarines Norte was created from Ambos Camarines.

Present

Naga City was the capital of Camarines Sur until 6 June 1955, when Pili, the adjoining town, was declared the Provincial Capital by virtue of R. A. 1336. The province celebrated its foundation anniversary, the 419th, for the very first time on 27 May 1998.

See also 
Legislative districts of Ambos Camarines

References 

Former provinces of the Philippines
States and territories established in 1579
1579 establishments in the Philippines
1917 disestablishments in the Philippines
History of Camarines Norte
History of Camarines Sur